Taphroderes is a genus within Coleoptera.  Taphroderes belongs to the Brentidae  familia .

Cladogram

:

Other potential species names
Animal Diversity Web lists a different set of species for Taphroderes.

References

External links
 Biolib.cz

Brentidae
Taxa named by Carl Johan Schönherr